George Letsas is the Chair in Philosophy of Law at University College London.

Works

References

Academics of University College London
Philosophers of law
Year of birth missing (living people)
Living people